Ryan J. Murphy (born March 21, 1979) is an American professional ice hockey forward who played the 2009–10 season in both the AHL and SM-liiga. He was selected by the Carolina Hurricanes in the 4th round (113th overall) of the 1999 NHL Entry Draft.

Amateur career
Murphy skated with the Thornhill Islanders in the Metro Junior A Hockey League before attending Bowling Green State University where he played four years of CCHA collegiate hockey with the Bowling Green Falcons men's ice hockey team (1997–2001).

Murphy played in the 1999 World Junior Ice Hockey Championships with Team USA.

Professional career
Following graduation, Ryan turned professional for the 2001–02 ECHL season, playing up with the Florida Everblades of the East Coast Hockey League. Ryan went on to play nine seasons of professional hockey, suiting up for 372 AHL games and another 124 ECHL games.

On June 30, 2009, Murphy became an unrestricted free agent. On November 25, 2009 it was announced that the Hamilton Bulldogs (AHL) had signed Murphy to a professional tryout contract, however he played only five games for the Bulldogs before being released by the club.

Ryan is the son of former Los Angeles Kings and Toronto Maple Leafs head coach Mike Murphy.

Career statistics

Regular season and playoffs

References

External links 

1979 births
Albany River Rats players
American men's ice hockey right wingers
Bowling Green Falcons men's ice hockey players
Carolina Hurricanes draft picks
Espoo Blues players
Florida Everblades players
Hamilton Bulldogs (AHL) players
Ice hockey people from Los Angeles
Living people
Lowell Devils players
Lowell Lock Monsters players